Harish Chaudhary (Hindi - हरीश चौधरी , Punjabi - ਹਰੀਸ਼ ਚੌਧਰੀ ) (born 13 May 1970) popularly known as 'Harishji' in his loksabha constituency Barmer-Jaisalmer, is a farmer leader & politician  serving as the incharge of Indian National Congress organisation in Punjab and Chandigarh and Member of the Rajasthan Legislative Assembly from Baytu constituency of Barmer district in Rajasthan as an Indian National Congress party candidate which he won in the 2018 legislative assembly elections. He has also served as the Cabinet Minister of Revenue, Colonization and Water Cooperation of Rajasthan for about 3 years. He had won Lok Sabha elections in 2009 from the Barmer-Jaisalmer constituency in Rajasthan. But in 2014 elections, he lost. He was National Secretary of the All India Congress Committee till 2014–2019.

Harish Chaudhary launched a massive agitation in July–August 2022 against the circular issued by the Vasundhara Raje government of Rajasthan in 2018 regarding OBC reservation, in which former MP of Barmer Jaisalmer and BJP leader Col. Sonaram Chaudhary assist him.

References

Living people
1970 births
India MPs 2009–2014
Rajasthani politicians
Lok Sabha members from Rajasthan
Members of Parliament from Barmer
Rajasthan MLAs 2018–2023
People from Barmer, Rajasthan
Indian National Congress politicians from Rajasthan